The Tour Landscape (formerly IBM Europe tower, Pascal tower and DDE tower) is an office skyscraper located in the business district of La Défense, and precisely Place des Degres, Puteaux. In 2017, a modernization project is announced that will see the merger of the two towers (Tours Pascal) and the total height increased to 101 meters. The restructuring project started in the summer of 2017 with the new name Tour Landscape.

References

External link
 Tour Landscape

Skyscraper office buildings in France
La Défense